Pandatarai is a town & (since 2008) nagar panchayat in the Kabirdham (formerly Kawardha) district of Chhattisgarh, India. 
This is a religious and tourist site.
In Pandatarai temple of Maa Mahamaya (durga) and a historical temple of lord Shivajaleshwar mahadev dongariya is near about Pandatarai and dargahe auliya sher shah vali are most popular places.
Dongariya mahadev is also papular destination
Pandatarai Pin code is 491559 and postal head office is Pandaria .

Pandatarai is surrounded by Bodla Tehsil towards the west, Kabirdham Tehsil towards the south, Kawardha Tehsil towards the south, and Lormi Tehsil towards the East.

Kawardha, Mungeli, Bemetra, and khairaagadh are the nearby cities to Pandatarai. Bilaspur are the nearest famous city.
Pandatarai is famous for its quality school education

Transportation to Pandatarai

By Rail

There is no railway station near to Pandatarai in less than 10 km. However Bilaspur Jn Rail Way Station is major railway station 98 km far but nearest to Pandatarai.

By Air

There is no Airport near to Pandatarai. However Raipur which is 150 km from Pandatarai is the nearest airport from here.

By Bus or Vehicle

It is on National Highway 130A (the Kawardha-Bilaspur road). Buses are easily available from all the major cities of Chhattisgarh like Bilaspur, Raipur, Kawardha, Durg, Rajnandgaon etc.

Education

Colleges near Pandatarai

Govt. College Pandatarai

Address : Near by Charbhata Khurd, NH 130A, Pandatarai, 491559

Govt. College Pandaria

Schools in Pandatarai

Govt Hr. Sec. School Pandatarai

Address : Pandatarai, Chhattisgarh . PIN- 491559, 

Bhoramdev Public School

Address : Near Sub-Station Pandatarai Chhattishgarh 
Saraswati Shishu Mandir Pandatarai

Address : Behind Mahamaya Mandir, Chhattisgarh . PIN- 491559, 

Jai Bharat Public School Pandatarai

Address : Madmada Road Pandatarai, Chhattisgarh . PIN- 491559, 

Divine Public School

Address : Behind Nagar Panchayat Pandatarai, Chhattisgarh . PIN- 491559, 

Cities and towns in Kabirdham